Regent University is a private Christian university in Virginia Beach, Virginia. It was founded by Pat Robertson in 1977 as Christian Broadcasting Network University and changed its name to Regent University in 1990. Regent offers traditional on-campus programs as well as distance education. Through its eight academic schools, Regent offers associate, bachelor's, master's, and doctoral degrees in over 70 courses of study. The university is accredited by the Commission on Colleges of the Southern Association of Colleges and Schools with specific programs accredited by other professional or national accreditors.

History
Plans for the university, originally named Christian Broadcasting Network University, began in 1977 by CBN founder and current Chancellor Pat Robertson. In 1990, the name was changed to Regent University. The university's name is designed to reference a regent, a person who exercises power in a monarchical country during the absence or incapacity of the sovereign; according to the school's catalog, "a regent is one who represents Christ, our Sovereign, in whatever sphere of life he or she may be called to serve Him." The university's current motto is "Christian Leadership to Change the World."

The first class, consisting of seventy-seven students, began in fall of 1978 when the school leased classroom space in Chesapeake, Virginia. The first students were all enrolled in what is now the School of Communication & the Arts. In May 1980, the first graduating class held its commencement, while the School of Education opened the following October. Simultaneously, the university took residence for the first time on its current campus in Virginia Beach, Virginia. The school proceeded to open its schools of business, divinity, government, and law by the mid-1980s. In 1984, Regent University received accreditation from the Southern Association of Colleges and Schools. In 1997, what would later become the School of Business and Leadership piloted an online Master of Arts program, an antecedent to the university's development of online education.

In 1995, the university opened a secondary campus in Alexandria, Virginia, following an outreach program geared toward teachers in the Washington, D.C., area. This facility was later sold. In 2000, Regent began an undergraduate degree-completion curriculum under the auspices of a new program, the Center for Professional Studies. This would later become the School of Undergraduate Studies, before finally being renamed as the College of Arts and Sciences in 2012.

Campus

Architecture and setting
The campus of Regent University comprises  of historicist neo-Georgian architecture, and is situated in the coastal city of Virginia Beach, Virginia. The university was named in 2015 among the thirty most beautiful college campuses in the South.

Academic and communal facilities
The University Library Building houses the university's libraries while Robertson Hall is home to the Schools of Government, Law, and Undergraduate Studies. The Communication & Performing Arts Center, home for the School of Communication & the Arts, is a  building with two theatres, a production studio, sound stage, screening theatres, and a backlot. The Student Center is a  facility includes a bookstore, student organization offices, dining hall, computer lab, and student lounge. The Administration Building, along with administrative offices, includes the School of Education. The Classroom Building accommodates the schools of Business & Leadership and Psychology & Counseling. The adjoined Chapel and Divinity Building are the most recent additions to the campus, completed in 2013.

The Founders Inn and Spa
Completed in 1990, The Founders Inn and Spa luxury hotel was originally part of the Christian Broadcasting Network before Regent University assumed ownership, and then in 2018 joined the Tapestry Collection by Hilton portfolio. The Hilton plans to take the following two years to renovate and redecorate The Founders Inn and Spa. The hotel features neo-Georgian architecture in keeping with the rest of the university campus. The name of the hotel refers to the Founding Fathers and the drafting of the United States Constitution in 1787.

Reputation

Online programs rankings
Regent University was ranked in 2015 by U.S. News & World Report as the 11th best online undergraduate program in the nation, and as the second best by OEDb in 2009. Regent is ranked 21st, 46th, and 78th, respectively, for its online graduate education programs, online graduate business programs, and online MBA. Regent's online MBA faculty was ranked first nationally in 2013 by U.S. News & World Report.

ABA national competition wins and moot court program
Moot court teams from the Regent University School of Law have placed as quarter-finalists or better in over 100 moot court competitions, winning more than 40 national and regional events. In 2006 and 2007, Regent Law won several national ABA moot court and negotiation competitions succeeding against teams from Harvard and Yale. Regent's moot court program was ranked sixth in the nation in 2015.

Education and film awards

Alumni of the School of Education have been awarded Hampton Roads Teacher of the Year more than 630 times. Other notable awards won by School of Education alumni include National Outstanding Principal of the Year (2012), Milken Educator Award Winner (2012), History Teacher of the Year for Virginia (2006), National Principal of the Year (2006), and National School Board Association Black Caucus's Educational Leadership Award (2005). The School of Communication & the Arts and its alumni have been the recipients of more than 360 national and international film and television awards, including wins at the Emmys, the Telly Awards, the Aurora Awards, Indie Fest, Accolade Global Film Competition, and the Virginia Independent Film Festival.

Ideology

In 1995, Harvey Cox, the Harvard theologian, wrote that Regent has been called "the Harvard of the Christian Right" but noted that "Regent, it appears, is not so much a boot camp for rightist cadres as a microcosm of the theological and intellectual turbulence within what is often mistakenly seen as a monolithic 'religious right' in America".

While expressing concerns about Robertson's alleged past expressions of antisemitism (faculty blamed this on poorly chosen ghost writers) and associations with dominion theology promoting Christian control of secular institutions that some critics believe inspired the school's name, Cox said the faculty insisted that Regent did not support Dominionism, pointing to the firing of Herbert Titus, the founding dean of the Law School, who was inclined to such a philosophy. Cox pointed to historian Bruce Barron's suggestion that the Regent faculty serve as a "moderating influence": "They are pragmatists who accept religious pluralism and do not insist on the universal applicability of Old Testament law" while preferring to focus on constitutional issues. Cox characterized Regent's mission as continuing in the tradition of religiously trained professionals by various Catholic and Protestant faiths such as Jesuit universities and (originally) Harvard. He found that academic freedom was promoted and that although half of the student body considered themselves affiliated with renewal theology, there existed a wider range of political attitudes than he first imagined.

With the goal of expanding its mission beyond a solely conservative base and to "posture itself as a broadly evangelical institution", the Regent School of Divinity convened a scholarly colloquium with the more liberal National Council of Churches and the Virginia Council of Churches, associations of mainline Protestant churches in 2008. The conference discussed their common approaches to evangelizing.

Freedom of expression controversy 
In September 2007, Adam Key, a second-year law student at Regent,
posted a lifted still from a video to the social networking website Facebook showing the school's chancellor, Pat Robertson,  scratching his forehead with his middle finger. The still gave the appearance that Robertson was making an obscene gesture. Key also criticized Robertson for urging the assassination of Venezuelan President Hugo Chávez. School officials asked Key to remove the still, publicly apologize and withhold public comment, or alternatively, defend the posting. Although Key did remove the photograph, he refused to apologize and submitted his defense on the grounds that it was protected speech. Regent rejected his argument and Key was subsequently suspended and removed. In November 2007, Key filed a lawsuit against Regent claiming fraud, violation of his right to free expression as governed by rules tied to federal funding, and defamation. Robertson said that, in general, freedom of speech does not encompass the use of these kinds of images. The university stated that Key violated the school's standards of conduct. However, Key's attorney countered with examples of racist images posted on Facebook by other Regent students about which the school took no action.

The school later claimed its actions were unrelated to the photograph and that he was a "security risk"; Key's attorney countered with an internal memo sent the day before the suspension indicating that Robertson was concerned with Key's "complaints".

In June 2009, the lawsuit was dismissed. The judge ruled that despite federal funding, Regent's decisions were not state actions and hence not governed by the First Amendment. He also found that Robertson had not defamed Keys and that "generic recruiting correspondence" from the school could not be considered a contract and thereby dismissed the fraud complaint. In November 2007, a civil rights lawyer representing Key sent a complaint to the American Bar Association calling for them to revoke the school's accreditation. Key claimed the university suspended him for his political and religious views in violation of ABA accreditation standards. However, this complaint was eventually dismissed with no wrongdoing found on the part of Regent.

Bush administration hires
According to Regent University, more than 150 of its graduates were hired by the federal government during the George W. Bush presidency including dozens in Bush's administration. As it was previously rare for alumni to go into government, Boston Globe journalist Charlie Savage suggested that the appointment of Office of Personnel Management director Kay Coles James, the former dean of Regent's government school, caused this sharp increase in Regent alumni employed in the government. An article about a Regent graduate who interviewed for a government position and Regent's low school rankings were cited as an example of the Bush administration hiring applicants with strong conservative credentials but weaker academic qualifications and less civil rights law experience than past candidates in the Civil Rights Division. In addition to Savage, several other commentators made similar assertions. The Washington Post contrasted the employment of Regent employees by Bush to the hiring practices of his successor Barack Obama who tended to select from higher-ranked secular colleges.

However, Savage noted that the school had improved since its days of "dismal numbers" and that the school has had wins in national moot-court and negotiation competitions. Though a  prominent critic of the school, Reverend Barry Lynn of Americans United for the Separation of Church and State advised against "underestimat[ing] the quality of a lot of the people that are there."

Relationship with President Donald Trump
In October 2016, Regent University was the site of an October 2016 rally for presidential candidate Donald J. Trump. A handful of Regent alumni said that Trump's values, however, were "wrong for the university." Regent University alumnus Jay Sekulow was a defense lawyer for President Trump.

Faculty

Regent has 138 full-time and 48 part-time faculty members, who are graduates of Yale, Harvard, Oxford, Duke, Johns Hopkins, Notre Dame, Vanderbilt, Baylor, and others, five of whom are Fulbright Scholars. Faculty are responsible for lecturing classes, advising both graduate and undergraduate students, and sitting on academic committees.

Several members are drawn from high levels of government. Former U.S. Attorney General under the Bush administration, John Ashcroft, was named Distinguished Professor in 2005 teaching a two-week course each semester in the Robertson School of Government and lecturing on national security law. Also named Distinguished Professor was former Chief of Naval Operations Admiral Vern Clark who teaches courses in leadership and government. In 2006, former Israeli Prime Minister Ehud Barak was a visiting faculty member for the School of Undergraduate Studies. Herb Titus, founding dean of the law school, was the 1996 vice-presidential candidate of the Constitution Party and a drafter of the Constitutional Restoration Act to permit government officials to acknowledge "God as the sovereign source of law, liberty, or government". Titus was fired in 1993 for holding a staunch view of Dominion Theology deemed to be "too extreme." In November 2016, the school announced that former Virginia Governor Bob McDonnell would begin teaching at the Robertson School of Government in January 2017. The school also announced that McDonnell would "help establish a Governor's Center for Federalism and Civility, an initiative that will assist the states in understanding their role in a federal society."

The School of Divinity includes both biblical scholars and religious practitioners, notably the theologian Graham Twelftree, Dean Emeritus H. Vinson Synan, Pentecostal theologian Amos Yong, and church historian Stanley M. Burgess. The late J. Rodman Williams was Professor Emeritus.

Student outcomes
According to the US Department of Education College Scorecard, Regent University has an undergraduate 8-year graduation rate of 27 percent. Median salary after attending ranges from $13,702 (BA in Drama/Theater Arts) to $51,972 (BS in Computer and Information Science). Two years into repayment, the status of student debtors:
25% Not Making Progress
24% Forbearance
17% Making Progress
16% Deferment
6% Paid In Full
6% Defaulted
4% Delinquent
1% Discharged

Athletics
The Regent athletic teams are called the Royals (whose logo is based on a lion). The university is a member of the United States Collegiate Athletic Association (USCAA), primarily competing in the Eastern Metro Athletic Conference (EMAC) since the 2021–22 academic year. The Royals also compete as a member of the National Christian Collegiate Athletic Association (NCCAA) in the South Region of the Division I level.

Regent competes in nine intercollegiate varsity sports: Men's sports include basketball, cross country, soccer and track & field; while women's sports include basketball, cross country, soccer, track & field and volleyball.

The intercollegiate athletics program was founded in 2016 with men's and women's track & field. Later in 2017, the university added co-ed cheerleading, men's & women's cross country, men's & women's soccer, and women's volleyball. In 2018, Regent added men's and women's basketball. As of 2020, only cheerleading was dropped out of the intercollegiate athletics program.

Notable alumni

Regent University alumni include:

 Sharon Weston Broome, former Louisiana state senator and current mayor-president of Baton Rouge & East Baton Rouge Parish.
 Jennifer Elvgren, writer.
 Monica Goodling, a 1999 graduate of Regent Law and director of public affairs for the U.S. Department of Justice from 2001 to 2007, is best known for her involvement in the dismissal of U.S. attorneys controversy, as was her press aide, 1998 law graduate John Nowacki, and Goodling's predecessor, 1998 School of Business and 1999 Robertson School of Government graduate Susan Richmond.
 Tony Hale, actor best known as Buster Bluth on the TV show Arrested Development.
 Todd Hunter, Anglican bishop of the Diocese of Churches for the Sake of Others, former president of Alpha USA, former national director of Association of Vineyard Churches
Gordon James Klingenschmitt, former Navy chaplain, Air Force officer, and elected member of the Colorado legislature.
 Charles Martin, author.
 Bob McDonnell, former Virginia governor.
 Winsome Sears, a 2003 MA graduate, is a businesswoman, veteran, and current Lieutenant Governor of Virginia; also the first black female Republican, first female veteran, and the first naturalized citizen delegate to serve in the Virginia House of Delegates.
 Jay Sekulow, a Ph.D. graduate, is Chief Counsel for Pat Robertson's American Center for Law and Justice, a non-profit public interest law firm specializing in constitutional issues of religious freedom.
 Jordan Sekulow, a 2009 graduate of Regent Law, is a lawyer, radio talk show host, former Washington Post blogger, political consultant, and author.
 Brennan Swain, winner of the CBS television show The Amazing Race Season 1 and also appeared on Camp Reality on Fox Reality Channel.
 Tom Thompson, oldest NCAA college football player.
 Jason Upton, a graduate of the School of Divinity, is a Contemporary Christian musician.
 Antonio Zarro, winner of a Student Academy Award for his 1986 student film Bird in a Cage.
 Daniel Kelly, former justice of the Wisconsin Supreme Court.

References

External links
 Official website
 Official athletics website

 
1977 establishments in Virginia
Council for Christian Colleges and Universities
Education in Virginia Beach, Virginia
Educational institutions established in 1977
Evangelicalism in Virginia
Nondenominational Christian universities and colleges
Nondenominational Christian universities and colleges in the United States
Universities and colleges accredited by the Southern Association of Colleges and Schools
Private universities and colleges in Virginia
Conservatism in the United States